Robert Olivo (June 16, 1937 – August 28, 1989), better known by his stage name  Ondine, was an American actor. He is best known for appearing in a series of films in the mid-1960s by Andy Warhol, whom he claimed to have met in 1961 at an orgy:

Ondine was the focus of Warhol's book, a, A Novel, based on transcripts of Ondine and others. He appeared in films made by his lover, Roger Jacoby, Dream Sphinx Opera, L'Amico Fried's Glamorous Friends, and Kunst Life.

In later years, he supported himself by showing Warhol films and delivering a lecture on his days as a Warhol superstar on the college circuit. He died of AIDS-related liver disease in Queens, New York in 1989, aged 52. He was portrayed in the film I Shot Andy Warhol by Michael Imperioli.

Filmography
Batman Dracula (1964)
Couch (1964)
Raw Weekend (1964)

Afternoon (1965)
Restaurant (1965)
Vinyl (1965)
Horse (1965)
Chelsea Girls (1966)
Since (1966)
Four Stars aka **** (1967)
The Loves of Ondine (1967)
Dream Sphinx Opera (1972)
Sugar Cookies (1973)
Silent Night, Bloody Night (1974)
Kunst Life (1975)
L'Amico Fried's Glamorous Friends (1976)

Quotes about Ondine
"You can't enjoy what he's doing to your psychology if you're so weak that you become paranoid, and there are people who tend to do that.  Otherwise, if you had any intellectual integrity at all, you would just feel his love, and you would enjoy it like it was better than a theater performance because it was really live." - Billy Name

See also
 New Andy Warhol Garrick Theatre

References

External links
Detailed Warhol fansite

Ondine at Factory Made

1937 births
1989 deaths
AIDS-related deaths in New York (state)
American male film actors
American people of Italian descent
Bisexual male actors
American LGBT actors
LGBT people from New York (state)
20th-century American male actors
People associated with The Factory